Longgang is a volcanic field in Jilin Province, China. It is also known as Chingyu, Longwan Group or Lung-wan Group. The field is forested and mostly undisturbed by human activities.

Longgang is located in an area of northeast China where the subduction of the Pacific Plate beneath the Eurasian Plate, along with other tectonic processes triggers volcanic activity. Some other volcanoes are found in the region, most importantly Changbaishan volcano which is found in the neighbouring Changbaishan volcanic field (120km to the East). 

Volcanic activity in the field goes back to the Pleistocene. Jinlongdingzi cone suffered a major Plinian eruption in 350 AD or 460 AD, which was accompanied by ash fall and the extrusion of a lava flow. Future volcanic activity in the field may result in hazardous Plinian eruptions.

Geography and geological context 

Northeast China is the site of major Cenozoic volcanism. The Pacific Plate subducts beneath the Eurasian Plate, along with back-arc spreading and continental rifting triggers volcanic activity in the region. Geothermal resources are also widespread.

Longgang belongs to a group of volcanoes in the Changbai Mountains.  farther east lies the Changbaishan volcanic field, including Changbaishan volcano on the China-North Korea border. This volcano is the most active and dangerous in the area, and the sole volcano to erupt felsic magma. Tephra from this volcano has been found in the Longgang field and tephra deposits at Longgang have been used to reconstruct volcanism in the wider region. Other volcanoes in the wider region include Jingbo Lake, Keluo, Wudalianchi and Xianjindao. The last of these is in North Korea.

Some neighbouring volcanoes feature similar anomalies. Based on these structures, it has been concluded that Changbaishan and Longgang are back-arc volcanoes associated with processes involving the sinking Pacific Plate slab. The Tan-Lu fault zone and the Fushun-Mishan fault may further influence Longgang volcanism.

Geology and geomorphology 

It contains lava flows, over 150 cinder cones and 8 tuff rings. 9 or 8 maars are found in the field's western half. The towns of Houhe, Jilin and Jingyu are located in the eastern part of the field. The area was historically sparsely inhabited and it was turned into a national forest park in 1992.

Another volcano formed by basalt and tephra is known as Dayizishan.

A number of crater lakes surrounded by forests exist in the Longgang field, which formed when water filled volcanic craters Among the volcanic centres of Longgang, the  large Sihailongwan maar southeast-east of Jinlongdingzi has been used for dating volcanic activity through sediment layers in the lakes. Similar research has been performed on other maars. Other maars are Dalongwan, Donglongwan, Longquanlongwan, Nanlongwan and Sanjialongwan; the Gushantun peatland is a former maar as well. Lava flows from the field dammed the Hani River during the late Pleistocene, forming a lake that later developed into the Hani peatland. Overall, more than 100 crater lakes and lava-dammed lakes and over 20 peatlands in maars occur in the Longgang volcanic field.

The volcanic field is constructed on a basement formed by rocks of Archaean age, such as the Anshan Migmatites consisting of amphibolite, gneiss and quartzites form the basement. The field is located at the edge of the North China Craton which underlies the volcanic field.

Petrology 

Rocks include basalt and trachybasalt. Olivine basalt, basanite and tholeiite have been found as well, with smaller amounts of trachyandesite. Tephras from different eruptions do not display significant differences in composition. Ultramafic xenoliths have been found in the rocks.

Phenocrysts include olivine, plagioclase and pyroxene. Alkali basalts have few vesicles and a gray colour. Basanites contain more olivine and less plagioclase/pyroxene phenocrysts. No non-basaltic magmas have been erupted at Longgang.

Partial melting of metasomatism-influenced mantle may be the origin of Longgang magmas. Some of the magmas underwent fractionation after their formation, but not all.

Environment 

Vegetation around the Hani peatland and Sihailongwan lake consists of broadleaf-coniferous forest. Peatlands have developed in some parts of the field. Some lava flows erupted from Jinlongdinzi now feature vegetation distinct from the pre-flow vegetation, including Abies nephrolepis and Betula platyphylla. Human influence is limited.

Airmasses come from central Asia during winter, while in summer southeasterlies from the Pacific Ocean dominate. The climate is overall cool.

The Longgang volcanic field contains climate records that have been used to reconstruct the former climate of the region, both in the form of deposits in lakes and in peatlands. Some of these records may go back over 12,000 years. Fluctuations of the strength of the winter and summer monsoons have been reconstructed from the peatlands. Two cold periods may coincide with two stages of Heinrich event 1 over 10,000 years ago. During the Medieval Climate Anomaly the climate was moister than during the Little Ice Age. Past environmental changes, such as peat growth and red tides in lakes, also leave records.

Eruptive history 

Volcanism occurred over three different phases, the Xiaoyishan period 2,150,000 - 750,000 years ago, the Longgang period 680,000 - 50,000 years ago and a third period during the Holocene. The oldest volcanic rocks are 27.3 million years old. Most centres formed between 680,000 and 50,000 years ago. Dayizishan and Diaoshuiu formed 71,000 ± 9,000 and 106,000 ± 13,000 years ago, respectively. 

Tephra layers found in lakes indicate that explosive volcanism was common in the field during the late ice age.Varve chronology has indicated the occurrence of eruptions 11,460 and 14,000 years before present; the first may have occurred at Jinlongdingzi where a second eruption occurred between 10,340-10,250 years ago. A tephra layer dated 15 BC - 26 AD is chemically similar to the one of Jinlongdingzi and may stem from an eruption in the Longgang field.

The youngest eruption occurred about 350 AD or 460 AD at Jinlongdingzi; although another date mentions an eruption 785 years before present and a lava flow that entered lake Dalongwan may be only a few centuries old. The 350/460 AD eruption of Jinlongdingzi caused ash fall east of the cone. It was probably forceful enough to damage the surrounding vegetation and trigger wildfires. A long lava flow was erupted from the western flank of Jinlongdingzi and went on for at least . 

Volcanic activity at Jinlongdingzi may still constitute a danger, especially Plinian eruptions. A new eruption may result in damage to property or fatalities especially east of the cone and the field is thus considered a potentially active volcano. Seismic tomography shows evidence of crustal melts persisting beneath Longgang. The 2008 Wenchuan earthquake triggered seismicity in the Longgang volcanic field.

Use 

Rocks from the Jinlongdingzi eruption have been used to simulate the properties of lunar rocks for applications in lunar exploration.

References

Sources

External links 
 PRELIMINARY VOLCANIC HAZARD ZONATION IN JINLONGDINGZI VOLCANO, LONGANG VOLCANO AREA, JILIN PROVINCE, CHINA 

Quaternary volcanism
Volcanoes of China
Maars